Tusa Aiono Misi Tupuola is a Samoan politician and former member of the Legislative Assembly of Samoa. He is a member of the Human Rights Protection Party.

Tusa worked as assistant chief executive, then secretary, of Samoa's Transport Control Board. He later worked for Samoa's Land Transport Authority.

He was first elected to the Legislative Assembly in the 2011 Samoan general election and appointed Associate Minister for Transport and Infrastructure. He lost his seat in the 2016 election. He later contested the 2021 election.

References

Living people
Members of the Legislative Assembly of Samoa
Human Rights Protection Party politicians
Year of birth missing (living people)